Rudy De Luca is an American screenwriter and actor best known for his work with filmmaker Mel Brooks. In April 1972, he opened The Comedy Store with Sammy Shore.

Filmography

As writer
The Carol Burnett Show (1967) (TV)
The Tim Conway Show (1970) (TV)
The Marty Feldman Comedy Machine (1971) (TV)
Silent Movie (with Mel Brooks, Barry Levinson and Ron Clark) (1976)
High Anxiety (with Mel Brooks, Barry Levinson and Ron Clark) (1977)
Peeping Times (1978) (TV)
Caveman (with Carl Gottlieb) (1981)
Transylvania 6-5000 (1985) (also Director)
Million Dollar Mystery (with Tim Metcalfe and Miguel Tejada-Flores) (1987)
Life Stinks (with Mel Brooks, Steve Haberman and Ron Clark) (1991)
Dracula: Dead and Loving It (with Mel Brooks and Steve Haberman) (1995)
The Good Bad Guy (with Ezio Greggio) (1997)
Screw Loose (with Steve Haberman) (1999) 
Box Office 3D: The Filmest of Films (2011)
Big Finish (with Martin Guigui) (2012)

As actor

As producer
Peeping Times (1978) (TV)

As director
Peeping Times (1978) (TV)
Transylvania 6-5000 (1985)

References

External links

American male screenwriters
Living people
Year of birth missing (living people)
Emmy Award winners
American male film actors
American writers of Italian descent
Place of birth missing (living people)